Rollingstone Creek is a stream in Winona County, in the U.S. state of Minnesota.

Rollingstone Creek is the figurative translation of the native Dakota language name for the creek, which is literally translated "the stream where the stone rolls".

See also
List of rivers of Minnesota

References

Rivers of Winona County, Minnesota
Rivers of Minnesota
Southern Minnesota trout streams